Schwarzbach is a river of the Hessian Ried, Hesse, Germany. It is a right tributary of the Rhine in Ginsheim. Including its right source river Gundbach, it is 43.5 km long.

See also
List of rivers of Hesse

References

Rivers of Hesse
Rivers of Germany